Rev. Miles Grant (December 13, 1819 in Torrington, Connecticut – March 24, 1911), Adventist preacher and teacher at Armenia Seminary. Advocate of conditional immortality from 1860 to the 1890s and author of Positive theology (1895)

Until twenty-one years of age he spent most of his time in hard farm labor, excepting winters, when at school.

References

People from Torrington, Connecticut
1819 births
1911 deaths